Banteay Chhmar is a commune (khum) in Thma Puok District in Banteay Meanchey province in northwest Cambodia. It is located 63 km north of Sisophon and about 20 km east of the Thai border. The commune of Banteay Chhmar contains 14 villages.

The massive temple of Banteay Chhmar, along with its satellite shrines and reservoir (baray), comprises one of the most important and least understood archaeological complexes from Cambodia's Angkor period.

History

Like Angkor Thom, the temple of Banteay Chhmar was constructed during the reign of Jayavarman VII in the late 12th or early 13th century.  One of the temple's shrines once held an image of Srindrakumararajaputra (the crown prince), a son of Jayavarman VII who died before him. The temple doors record Yasovarman I's failed invasion of Champa.

The long Old Khmer inscription found at the site (K.227), and now on display in the National Museum, Phnom Penh, relates how Prince Srindrakumara was protected on two occasions by four companions in arms, once against Rahu, and once on a military campaign against Champa. Their four statues, with one of the prince, was placed in the central chapel.

Another bas-relief states Yasovarman II was attacked by Rahu, but "saved by a young prince."

The site

The complex resembles Angkor Thom and other structures attributed to Jayavarman VII. It is one of two sites outside Angkor with the enigmatic face-towers. Besides that, its outer gallery is carved with bas-reliefs depicting military engagements and daily life scenes very similar to the well-known ones in Bayon.

The complex is oriented to the east, where there's a dried baray (about 1.6 by 0.8 km), which had a temple on an artificial island (mebon) in its centre. There are three enclosures, as typical. The external one, largely ruined, was 1.9 by 1.7 km and surrounded by a moat. The middle enclosure, provided with a moat too, is 850 by 800 m. It contains the main temple, surrounded by a gallery with reliefs 250 by 200 m which constitutes the third inner enclosure.

Besides the main temple and the mebon there are other eight secondary temples. Four stelae detailing Jayavarman VII's genealogy were placed (though they remain unfinished) at each of the four corners of the third enclosure wall, mirroring the stelae that occupied the four corner-shrines (Prasat Chrung) of the king's capital at Angkor Thom.

Modern threats
Because of its remote location and its proximity to the Thai border, the complex has been subjected to severe looting, especially in the 1990s. In 1998, 2000 and 2002 the temple was listed by the World Monuments Fund as one of the top one hundred most endangered sites in the world.

For example, in 1998 a group of soldiers stole a 30-metre section of the southern wall. The bas-reliefs of Banteay Chhmar once displayed eight exceptional Avalokiteśvaras in the west gallery, but now only two remain. In January 1999 looters dismantled sections of the western gallery wall containing these bas-reliefs. They were intercepted by Thai police and 117 sandstone pieces of the wall were recovered. They are now on display in the National Museum of Cambodia in Phnom Penh.

Villages

 Kouk Samraong(គោកសំរោង)
 Koet(កើត)
 Kbal Tonsaong(ក្បាលទន្សោង)
 Banteay Chhmar Cheung(បន្ទាយឆ្មារជើង)
 Bangtey Chmar Khang Lech(បន្ទាយឆ្មារលិច)
 Kbal Krabei(ក្បាលក្របី)
 Banteay Chhmar Tboung(បន្ទាយឆ្មារត្បូង)
 Trapeim Thlok
 Thma Daekkeh(ថ្មដែកកេះ)
 Thlok(ថ្លុក)
 Kouk Samraong Lech(គោកសំរោងលិច)
 Srah Chrey(ស្រះជ្រៃ)
 Prey Changha(ព្រៃចង្ហារ)
 Prasat Tbeng(ប្រាសាទត្បែង)
 Dang Rek(ដងរែក)

World Heritage Status 
This site was added to the UNESCO World Heritage Tentative List on March 27, 2020 (originally proclaimed September 1, 1992) in the Cultural category.

References

Bibliography

External links

Banteay Chhmar project summary at Global Heritage Fund
Explore Banteay Chhmar on Global Heritage Network
The fundamental 1937 article "Banteay Chhmar: Marvelous Khmer City in Cambodia" by George Groslier
Banteay Chhmar on Angkorguide.net 
Visit Banteay Chhmar
 Banteay Chhmar, Photographic Documentation and Photo Gallery

Communes of Banteay Meanchey province
Thma Puok District
Buildings and structures in Banteay Meanchey province
Angkorian sites in Banteay Meanchey Province